Æthelflæd, Lady of the Mercians ( 870 – 12 June 918) ruled Mercia in the English Midlands from 911 until her death. She was the eldest daughter of Alfred the Great, king of the Anglo-Saxon kingdom of Wessex, and his wife Ealhswith.

Æthelflæd was born around 870 at the height of the Viking invasions of England. By 878, most of England was under Danish Viking rule – East Anglia and Northumbria having been conquered, and Mercia partitioned between the English and the Vikings – but in that year Alfred won a crucial victory at the Battle of Edington. Soon afterwards the English-controlled western half of Mercia came under the rule of Æthelred, Lord of the Mercians, who accepted Alfred's overlordship. Alfred adopted the title King of the Anglo-Saxons (previously he was titled King of the West Saxons like his predecessors) claiming to rule all Anglo-Saxon people not living in areas under Viking control. In the mid-880s, Alfred sealed the strategic alliance between the surviving English kingdoms by marrying Æthelflæd to Æthelred.

Æthelred played a major role in fighting off renewed Viking attacks in the 890s, together with Æthelflæd's brother, the future King Edward the Elder. Æthelred and Æthelflæd fortified Worcester, gave generous donations to Mercian churches and built a new minster in Gloucester. Æthelred's health probably declined early in the next decade, after which it is likely that Æthelflæd was mainly responsible for the government of Mercia. Edward had succeeded as King of the Anglo-Saxons in 899, and in 909 he sent a West Saxon and Mercian force to raid the northern Danelaw. They returned with the remains of the royal Northumbrian saint Oswald, which were translated to the new Gloucester minster. Æthelred died in 911 and Æthelflæd then ruled Mercia as Lady of the Mercians. The accession of a female ruler in Mercia is described by the historian Ian Walker as "one of the most unique events in early medieval history".

Alfred had built a network of fortified burhs and in the 910s Edward and Æthelflæd embarked on a programme of extending them. Among the towns where she built defences were Wednesbury, Bridgnorth, Tamworth, Stafford, Warwick, Chirbury and Runcorn. In 917 she sent an army to capture Derby, the first of the Five Boroughs of the Danelaw to fall to the English, a victory described by Tim Clarkson as "her greatest triumph". In 918 Leicester surrendered without a fight. Shortly afterwards the Viking leaders of York offered her their loyalty, but she died on 12June 918 before she could take advantage of the offer, and a few months later Edward completed the conquest of Mercia. Æthelflæd was succeeded by her daughter Ælfwynn, but in December Edward took personal control of Mercia and carried Ælfwynn off to Wessex.

Historians disagree whether Mercia was an independent kingdom under Æthelred and Æthelflæd but they agree that Æthelflæd was a great ruler who played an important part in the conquest of the Danelaw. She was praised by Anglo-Norman chroniclers such as William of Malmesbury, who described her as "a powerful accession to [Edward's] party, the delight of his subjects, the dread of his enemies, a woman of enlarged soul". According to Pauline Stafford, "like ... ElizabethI she became a wonder to later ages". In Nick Higham's view, medieval and modern writers have been so captivated by her that Edward's reputation has suffered unfairly in comparison.

Background
Mercia was the dominant kingdom in southern England in the eighth century and maintained its position until it suffered a decisive defeat by Wessex at the Battle of Ellandun in 825. Thereafter the two kingdoms became allies, which was to be an important factor in English resistance to the Vikings.

In 865 the Viking Great Heathen Army landed in East Anglia and used this as a starting point for an invasion. The East Anglians were forced to buy peace and the following year the Vikings invaded Northumbria, where they appointed a puppet king in 867. They then moved on Mercia, where they spent the winter of 867–868. King Burgred of Mercia was joined by King Æthelred of Wessex and his brother, the future King Alfred, for a combined attack on the Vikings, who refused an engagement; in the end the Mercians bought peace with them. The following year, the Vikings conquered East Anglia. In 874 the Vikings expelled King Burgred and Ceolwulf became the last King of Mercia with their support. In 877 the Vikings partitioned Mercia, taking the eastern regions for themselves and allowing Ceolwulf to keep the western ones. He was described by the Anglo-Saxon Chronicle as "a foolish king's thegn" who was a puppet of the Vikings. The historian Ann Williams regards this view as partial and distorted, that he was accepted as a true king by the Mercians and by King Alfred. The situation was transformed the following year when Alfred won a decisive victory over the Danes at the Battle of Edington.

Ceolwulf is not recorded after 879. His successor as the ruler of the English western half of Mercia, Æthelflæd's husband Æthelred, is first seen in 881 when, according to the historian of medieval Wales, Thomas Charles-Edwards, he led an unsuccessful Mercian invasion of the north Welsh Kingdom of Gwynedd. In 883 he made a grant with the consent of King Alfred, thus acknowledging Alfred's lordship. In 886 Alfred occupied the Mercian town of London, which had been in Viking hands. He then received the submission of all English not under Viking control and handed control of London over to Æthelred. In the 890s, Æthelred and Edward, Alfred's son and future successor, fought off more Viking attacks. Alfred died in 899 and Edward's claim to the throne was disputed by Æthelwold, son of Alfred's elder brother. Æthelwold joined forces with the Vikings when he was unable to get sufficient support in Wessex, and his rebellion only ended with his death in battle in December 902.

Sources
The most important source for history in this period is the Anglo-Saxon Chronicle but Æthelflæd is almost ignored in the standard West Saxon version, in what F. T. Wainwright calls "a conspiracy of silence". He argues that King Edward was anxious not to encourage Mercian separatism and did not wish to publicise his sister's accomplishments, in case she became a symbol of Mercian claims. Brief details of her actions were preserved in a pro-Mercian version of the Chronicle known as the Mercian Register or the Annals of Æthelflæd; although it is now lost, elements were incorporated into several surviving versions of the Chronicle. The Register covers the years 902 to 924, and focuses on Æthelflæd's actions; Edward is hardly mentioned and her husband only twice, on his death and as father of their daughter. Information about Æthelflæd's career is also preserved in the Irish chronicle known as the Three Fragments. According to Wainwright, it "contains much that is legendary rather than historical. But it also contains, especially for our period, much genuine historical information which seems to have its roots in a contemporary narrative." She was praised by Anglo-Norman chroniclers such as William of Malmesbury and John of Worcester and she has received more attention from historians than any other secular woman in Anglo-Saxon England.

Family
Æthelflæd was born around 870, the oldest child of King Alfred the Great and his Mercian wife, Ealhswith, who was a daughter of Æthelred Mucel, ealdorman of the Gaini, one of the tribes of Mercia. Ealhswith's mother, Eadburh, was a member of the Mercian royal house, probably a descendant of King Coenwulf (796–821). Æthelflæd was thus half-Mercian and the alliance between Wessex and Mercia was sealed by her marriage to Æthelred, Lord of the Mercians. They are mentioned in Alfred's will, which probably dates to the 880s. Æthelflæd, described only as "my eldest daughter", received an estate and 100 mancuses, while Æthelred, the only ealdorman to be mentioned by name, received a sword worth 100 mancuses. Æthelflæd was first recorded as Æthelred's wife in a charter of 887, when he granted two estates to the see of Worcester "with the permission and sign-manual of King Alfred" and the attestors included "Æthelflæd conjux". The marriage may have taken place earlier, perhaps when he submitted to Alfred following the recovery of London in 886. Æthelred was much older than Æthelflæd and they had one known child, a daughter called Ælfwynn. Æthelstan, the eldest son of Edward the Elder and future king of England, was brought up in their court and, in the view of Martin Ryan, certainly joined their campaigns against the Vikings.

Æthelred's descent is unknown. Richard Abels describes him as "somewhat of a mysterious character", who may have claimed royal blood and been related to King Alfred's father-in-law, Ealdorman Æthelred Mucel. In the view of Ian Walker: "He was a royal ealdorman whose power base lay in the south-west of Mercia in the former kingdom of the Hwicce around Gloucester". Alex Woolf suggests that he was probably the son of King Burgred of Mercia and King Alfred's sister Æthelswith, although that would mean that the marriage between Æthelflæd and Æthelred was uncanonical, because Rome then forbade marriage between first cousins.

Æthelflæd and Æthelred
Compared to the rest of England, much of English Mercia —Gloucestershire, Worcestershire, Herefordshire and Shropshire —was unusually stable in the Viking age. It did not suffer major attacks and it did not come under great pressure from Wessex. Mercian scholarship had high prestige at the courts of Alfred and Edward. Worcester was able to preserve considerable intellectual and liturgical continuity and, with Gloucester, became the centre of a Mercian revival under Æthelred and Æthelflæd that extended into the more unstable areas of Staffordshire and Cheshire. Charters show the Mercian leaders supporting the revival by their generosity to monastic communities. In 883 Æthelred granted privileges to Berkeley Abbey and in the 890s he and Æthelflæd issued a charter in favour of the church of Worcester. This was the only occasion in Alfred's lifetime when they are known to have acted jointly; generally Æthelred acted on his own, usually acknowledging the permission of King Alfred. Æthelflæd witnessed charters of Æthelred in 888, 889 and 896. In 901 Æthelflæd and Æthelred gave land and a golden chalice weighing thirty mancuses to the shrine of Saint Mildburg at Much Wenlock church.

At the end of the ninth century, Æthelred and Æthelflæd fortified Worcester, with the permission of King Alfred and at the request of Bishop Werferth, described in the charter as "their friend". They granted the church of Worcester a half share of the rights of lordship over the city, covering land rents and the proceeds of justice, and in return the cathedral community agreed in perpetuity to dedicate a psalm to them three times a day and a mass and thirty psalms every Saturday. As the rights of lordship had previously belonged fully to the church, this represented the beginning of transfer from episcopal to secular control of the city. In 904 Bishop Werferth granted a lease of land in the city to Æthelred and Æthelflæd, to be held for the duration of their lives and that of their daughter Ælfwynn. The land was valuable, including most of the city's usable river frontage, and control of it enabled the Mercian rulers to dominate over and profit from the city.

Æthelred's health probably declined at some stage in the decade after Alfred died in 899, and Æthelflæd may have become the de facto ruler of Mercia by 902. According to the Three Fragments, the Norse (Norwegian) Vikings were expelled from Dublin and then made an abortive attack on Wales. When this failed they applied to Æthelflæd, her husband being ill, for permission to settle near Chester. Æthelflæd agreed and for some time they were peaceful. The Norse Vikings then joined with the Danes in an attack on Chester, but this failed because Æthelflæd had fortified the town, and she and her husband persuaded the Irish among the attackers to change sides. Other sources confirm that the Norse were driven out of Dublin in 902 and that Æthelflæd fortified Chester in 907. Æthelflæd re-founded Chester as a burh and she is believed to have enhanced its Roman defences by running walls from the north-west and south-east corners of the fort to the River Dee. Simon Ward, who excavated an Anglo-Saxon site in Chester, sees the later prosperity of the town as owing much to the planning of Æthelflæd and Edward. After Æthelflæd's death, Edward encountered fierce resistance to his efforts to consolidate his control of the north-west and he died there in 924, shortly after suppressing a local rebellion. Æthelred was well enough to witness charters at a meeting of Edward's court in 903, but he did not witness any later surviving charter.

In 909 Edward sent a West Saxon and Mercian force to the northern Danelaw, where it raided for five weeks. The remains of the royal Northumbrian saint Oswald were seized and taken from his resting place in Bardney Abbey in Lincolnshire to Gloucester. In the late ninth century Gloucester had become a burh with a street plan similar to Winchester, and Æthelred and Æthelflæd had repaired its ancient Roman defences. In 896 a meeting of the Mercian witan was held in the royal hall at Kingsholm, just outside the town. The Mercian rulers built a new minster in Gloucester and, although the building was small, it was embellished on a grand scale, with rich sculpture. The church appears to have been an exact copy of the Old Minster, Winchester. It was initially dedicated to St Peter but when Oswald's remains were brought to Gloucester in 909, Æthelflæd had them translated from Bardney to the new minster, which was renamed St Oswald's in his honour. The relics gave the church great prestige as Oswald had been one of the most important founding saints of Anglo-Saxon Christianity as well as a ruling monarch, and the decision to translate his relics to Gloucester shows the importance of the town to Æthelred and Æthelflæd, who were buried in St Oswald's Minster. Simon Keynes describes the town as "the main seat of their power" and Carolyn Heighway believes that the foundation of the church was probably a family and dynastic enterprise, encouraged by Alfred and supported by Edward and Bishop Werferth. Heighway and Michael Hare wrote:

Mercia had a long tradition of venerating royal saints and this was enthusiastically supported by Æthelred and Æthelflæd. Saintly relics were believed to give supernatural legitimacy to rulers' authority, and Æthelflæd was probably responsible for the foundation or re-foundation of Chester Minster and the transfer to it of the remains of the seventh-century Mercian princess Saint Werburgh from Hanbury in Staffordshire. She may also have translated the relics of the martyred Northumbrian prince Ealhmund from Derby to Shrewsbury. In 910 the Danes retaliated against the English attack of the previous year by invading Mercia, raiding as far as Bridgnorth in Shropshire. On their way back they were caught by an English army in Staffordshire and their army was destroyed at the Battle of Tettenhall, opening the way for the recovery of the Danish Midlands and East Anglia over the next decade.

Lady of the Mercians

On her husband's death in 911, Æthelflæd became Myrcna hlædige, "Lady of the Mercians". Ian Walker describes her succession as the only case of a female ruler of a kingdom in Anglo-Saxon history and "one of the most unique events in early medieval history". In Wessex, royal women were not allowed to play any political role; Alfred's wife was not granted the title of queen and was never a witness to charters. In Mercia, Alfred's sister Æthelswith had been the wife of King Burgred of Mercia; she had witnessed charters as queen and had made grants jointly with her husband and in her own name. Æthelflæd benefited from a Mercian tradition of queenly importance, and was able to play a key role in the history of the early tenth century as Lady of the Mercians, which would not have been possible in Wessex.

When Æthelred died, Edward took control of the Mercian towns of London and Oxford and their hinterlands, which Alfred had put under Mercian control. Ian Walker suggests that Æthelflæd accepted this loss of territory in return for recognition by her brother of her position in Mercia. Alfred had constructed a network of fortified burhs in Wessex, and Edward and Æthelflæd now embarked on a programme of extending them to consolidate their defences and provide bases for attacks on the Vikings. According to Frank Stenton, Æthelflæd led Mercian armies on expeditions, which she planned.  He commented: "It was through reliance on her guardianship of Mercia that her brother was enabled to begin the forward movement against the southern Danes which is the outstanding feature of his reign".

Æthelflæd had already fortified an unknown location called Bremesburh in 910 and in 912 she built defences at Bridgnorth to cover a crossing of the River Severn. In 913 she built forts at Tamworth to guard against the Danes in Leicester, and in Stafford to cover access from the Trent Valley. In 914 a Mercian army drawn from Gloucester and Hereford repelled a Viking invasion from Brittany, and the Iron Age Eddisbury hill fort was repaired to protect against invasion from Northumbria or Cheshire, while Warwick was fortified as further protection against the Leicester Danes. In 915 Chirbury was fortified to guard a route from Wales and Runcorn on the River Mersey. Defences were built before 914 at Hereford, and probably Shrewsbury and two other fortresses, at Scergeat and Weardbyrig, which have not been located.

In 917 invasions by three Viking armies failed as Æthelflæd sent an army which captured Derby and the territory around it. The town was one of the Five Boroughs of the Danelaw, together with Leicester, Lincoln, Nottingham and Stamford. Derby was the first to fall to the English; she lost "four of her thegns who were dear to her" in the battle. Tim Clarkson, who describes Æthelflæd as "renowned as a competent war-leader", regards the victory at Derby as "her greatest triumph". At the end of the year, the East Anglian Danes submitted to Edward. In early 918, Æthelflæd gained possession of Leicester without opposition and most of the local Danish army submitted to her. A few months later, the leading men of Danish-ruled York offered to pledge their loyalty to Æthelflæd, probably to secure her support against Norse raiders from Ireland, but she died on 12 June 918, before she could take advantage of the offer. No similar offer is known to have been made to Edward. According to the Three Fragments, in 918 Æthelflæd led an army of Scots and Northumbrian English against forces led by the Norse Viking leader Ragnall at the Battle of Corbridge in Northumbria. Historians consider this unlikely, but she may have sent a contingent to the battle. Both sides claimed victory but Ragnall was able to establish himself as ruler of Northumbria. In the Three Fragments, Æthelflæd also formed a defensive alliance with the Scots and the Strathclyde British, a claim accepted by Clarkson.

Little is known of Æthelflæd's relations with the Welsh. The only recorded event took place in 916, when she sent an expedition to avenge the murder of a Mercian abbot and his companions; her men destroyed the royal crannog of Brycheiniog on Llangorse Lake and captured the queen and thirty-three of her companions. According to a version of the Anglo-Saxon Chronicle  strongly sympathetic to Edward the Elder, after Æthelflæd's death "the kings among the Welsh, Hywel and Clydog and Idwal, and all the Welsh people sought to have [Edward] as their lord". Hywel Dda was king of Dyfed in south-west Wales, Clydog ap Cadell probably king of Powys in the north-east, and Idwal ab Anarawd king of Gwynedd in the north-west. Gwent in south-east Wales was already under West Saxon lordship but, in the view of Charles-Edwards, this passage shows that the other Welsh kingdoms were under Mercian lordship until Edward took direct power over Mercia.

No coins were issued with the name of Æthelred or Æthelflæd on them, but in the 910s silver pennies were minted in west Mercian towns with unusual ornamental designs on the reverse and this may have reflected Æthelflæd's desire to distinguish specie issued under her control from that of her brother. After her death, west Mercian coin reverses were again the same as those on coins produced in Wessex. No charters of Edward survive for the period between 910 and his death in 924, whereas two survive in Æthelflæd's sole name, S 224, possibly dating to 914 and S 225, dated 9 September 915, issued at Weardbyrig, one of the burhs she built at an unidentified location.

Death and aftermath

Æthelflæd died at Tamworth on 12June 918 and her body was carried  to Gloucester, where she was buried with her husband in their foundation, St Oswald's Minster. According to the Mercian Register, Æthelflæd was buried in the east porticus. A building suitable for a royal mausoleum has been found by archaeological investigation at the east end of the church and this may have been St Oswald's burial place. Placement next to the saint would have been a prestigious burial location for Æthelred and Æthelflæd. William of Malmesbury wrote that their burial places were found in the south porticus during building works in the early twelfth century. He may have been misinformed about the position but it is also possible that the tombs were moved from their prestigious position next to the saint, when the couple became less known over time or when tenth-century kings acted to minimise the honour paid to their Mercian predecessors.

The choice of burial place was symbolic. Victoria Thompson argues that if Æthelflæd had chosen Edward's royal mausoleum in Winchester as the burial place for her husband and herself, that would have emphasised Mercia's subordinate status, whereas a traditional Mercian royal burial place such as Repton would have been a provocative declaration of independence; Gloucester, near the border with Wessex, was a compromise between the two. Martin Ryan sees the foundation as "something like a royal mausoleum, intended to replace the one at Repton (Derbyshire) that had been destroyed by the Vikings". Æthelflæd died a few months too early to see the final conquest of the southern Danelaw by Edward. She was succeeded as Lady of the Mercians by her daughter, Ælfwynn, but in early December 918 Edward deposed her and took Mercia under his control. Many Mercians disliked the subordination of their ancient kingdom to Wessex, and Wainwright describes the Mercian annalist's description of the deposition of Ælfwynn as "heavy with resentment". Edward died in 924 at Farndon in Cheshire a few days after putting down a rebellion by Mercians and Welshmen at Chester.

Legacy

To the West Saxon version of the Anglo-Saxon Chronicle, Æthelflæd was merely King Edward's sister, whereas for the Mercian Register she was Lady of the Mercians. Irish and Welsh annals described her as a queen and the Annals of Ulster, which ignore the deaths of Alfred and Edward, described her as famosissima regina Saxonum (renowned Saxon queen). She was also praised by Anglo-Norman historians such as John of Worcester and William of Malmesbury, who described her as "a powerful accession to [Edward's] party, the delight of his subjects, the dread of his enemies, a woman of enlarged soul". He claimed that she declined to have sex after the birth of her only child because it was "unbecoming of the daughter of a king to give way to a delight which, after a time, produced such painful consequences". According to Nick Higham, "successive medieval and modern writers were quite captivated by her" and her brother's reputation has suffered unfairly in comparison. In the twelfth century, Henry of Huntingdon paid her his own tribute:
Heroic Elflede! great in martial fame,
A man in valour, woman though in name:
Thee warlike hosts, thee, nature too obey'd,
Conqu'ror o'er both, though born by sex a maid.
Chang'd be thy name, such honour triumphs bring.
A queen by title, but in deeds a king.
Heroes before the Mercian heroine quail'd:
Caesar himself to win such glory fail'd.

Some historians believe that Æthelred and Æthelflæd were independent rulers. In the Handbook of British Chronology, David Dumville refers to "Q. Æthelflæd" and comments, "The titles given her by all sources (hlæfdige, regina) imply that she wielded royal power and authority". Alex Woolf concurs and Pauline Stafford describes Æthelflæd as "the last Mercian queen", referred to in charters in such terms as "by the gift of Christ's mercy ruling the government of the Mercians". Stafford argues that Æthelred and Æthelflæd exercised most or all of the powers of a monarch after Alfred's death but it would have been a provocative act formally to claim regality, especially after Æthelwold's rebellion. Stafford sees her as a "warrior queen", "Like ... ElizabethI she became a wonder to later ages." According to Charles Insley,

Wainwright sees Æthelflæd as willingly accepting a subordinate role in a partnership with her brother and agreeing to his plan of unification of Wessex and Mercia under his rule. Wainwright argues that he probably sent his oldest son Æthelstan to be brought up in Mercia, to make him more acceptable to the Mercians as king; Æthelflæd does not appear to have tried to find a husband for her daughter, who must have been nearly thirty by 918. In Wainwright's view, she was ignored in West Saxon sources for fear that recognition of her achievements would encourage Mercian separatism:

Simon Keynes points out that all coins were issued in Edward's name, and while the Mercian rulers were able to issue some charters on their own authority, others acknowledged Edward's lordship. In 903 a Mercian ealdorman "petitioned King Edward, and also Æthelred and Æthelflæd, who then held rulership and power over the race of the Mercians under the aforesaid king". Keynes argues that a new polity was created when Æthelred submitted to Alfred in the 880s, covering Wessex and English (western) Mercia. In Keynes's view, "the conclusion seems inescapable that the Alfredian polity of the kingship 'of the Anglo-Saxons' persisted in the first quarter of the tenth century, and that the Mercians were thus under Edward's rule from the beginning of his reign". Ryan believes that the Mercian rulers "had a considerable but ultimately subordinate share of royal authority".

In Higham's view, Keynes makes a strong case that Edward ruled over an Anglo-Saxon state with a developing administrative and ideological unity but that Æthelflæd and Æthelred did much to encourage a separate Mercian identity, such as establishing cults of Mercian saints at their new burhs, as well as reverence for their great Northumbrian royal saint at Gloucester:

Commemoration
In June 2018, Æthelflæd's funeral was re-enacted in front of a crowd of 10,000 people in Gloucester, as part of a series of living history events marking the 1,100th anniversary of her death.

The 1,100th anniversary of the death of Æthelflaed was marked throughout 2018 in Tamworth with a number of major events, including the unveiling of a new six-metre statue, the creation of the town's biggest ever piece of community art, a major commemorative church service, talks, a special guided walk, commemorative ale and an academic conference weekend drawing academics and delegates from all over the world.

Notes

Citations

Bibliography

Further reading

External links

 

870s births
Mercian monarchs
10th-century rulers in Europe
9th-century English people
9th-century English women
10th-century women rulers
House of Wessex
Women in medieval European warfare
Burials at St Oswald's Priory, Gloucester
Daughters of kings